The 1996 Big East men's basketball tournament took place at Madison Square Garden in New York City. Its winner received the Big East Conference's automatic bid to the 1996 NCAA tournament. It is a single-elimination tournament with four rounds and the three highest seeds received byes in the first round. Connecticut, the Big East regular season winner, received the number one seed in the tournament.  

Connecticut defeated Georgetown, 75-74 to claim its second Big East tournament championship.

Bracket

Awards
Dave Gavitt Trophy (Most Outstanding Player): Victor Page, Georgetown

All-Tournament Team
 Ray Allen (Connecticut)
 Allen Iverson (Georgetown)
 Kerry Kittles (Villanova)
 Travis Knight (Connecticut)
 Victor Page (Georgetown)
 John Wallace (Syracuse)

References

Tournament
Big East men's basketball tournament
Basketball in New York City
College sports in New York City
Sports competitions in New York City
Sports in Manhattan
Big East men's basketball tournament
Big East men's basketball tournament
1990s in Manhattan
Madison Square Garden